The 1977–78 La Liga was the 47th season since its establishment. It started on September 3, 1977, and finished on May 7, 1978.

Team locations

League table

Results table

Pichichi Trophy

References 
 La Liga 1977/1978
 Primera División 1977/78
 List of La Liga Champions

External links 
  Official LFP Site

La Liga seasons
1977–78 in Spanish football leagues
Spain